"We Up" is a song by American hip hop recording artist 50 Cent. It was originally released as the third official single from his upcoming fifth studio album Street King Immortal, but was later removed from the project.  It was officially released to public on March 22, 2013, on Interscope Records' SoundCloud account, and made available for purchase on March 25, 2013. The song features American rapper and Aftermath labelmate Kendrick Lamar, and production from Roc Nation producer Davaughn. It uses a sample from "Something About Us" by Daft Punk, who received a songwriting credit. The song was released to Rhythmic contemporary radio on May 28, 2013.

Background 
A different version of the song came out as a preview in January featuring 50 Cent's two verses and one by Kidd Kidd, which was later removed from the final version of the song. It was also intended to be a song of Kidd Kidd's mixtape, but ended up being 50's song. The full version of it, featuring Kidd Kidd, Kendrick Lamar and only one verse by 50 Cent, was released on February 15, 2013.

The single version of 'We Up' was released on March 22, 2013, with Kidd Kidd removed from the track. A verse by 50 previewed in January, which wasn't on its full version, was re-added to it. It was made available for purchase on digital retailers, such as Amazon.com and iTunes Store, on March 25, 2013.

Music video 
Two music videos were shot, for different versions of the song. The first one released, called "video before the video", didn't include appearances from Kendrick Lamar though his verse was still played. It had 50 Cent and Kidd Kidd in it, holding bottles and wearing suits while singing their parts as it was already shown in the song's preview.

The video for song's single version was shot in Los Angeles. A behind-the-scenes video was featured in VH1's series Behind the Music mastered episode of 50 Cent aired in March. It came out on March 25, 2013, on 50 Cent's VEVO channel. Both videos were directed by fellow video director Eif Rivera.

Live performances 
While performing at Roseland Ballroom in New York City on February 27, 2013, Kendrick Lamar brought out 50 Cent for We Up's performance, along with G-Unit rapper Tony Yayo.

Track listing 
Digital download
"We Up"  - 3:18

Credits and personnel 
Songwriter(s) – Curtis Jackson, Davaughn Lennard, Kendrick Duckworth, Guy-Manuel de Homem-Christo, Thomas Bangalter
Producer – Davaughn

Chart performance

Weekly charts

Release history

References

External links
 

2013 singles
50 Cent songs
Kendrick Lamar songs
Songs written by 50 Cent
Songs written by Kendrick Lamar
Shady Records singles
Aftermath Entertainment singles
Interscope Records singles
2013 songs
Songs written by Guy-Manuel de Homem-Christo
Songs written by Thomas Bangalter